Ching is a Chinese and English surname.

Origins
As a Chinese surname, Chow may be a romanisation of the pronunciations in different varieties of Chinese of the following surnames, listed based on their Pinyin romanisation (which reflects the Mandarin Chinese pronunciation):
 Jing (various characters and tones), spelled Ching in the Wade–Giles romanization of Mandarin Chinese, which was common up to the 20th century and remains widespread in Taiwan:
 
  (）
 
 
 
 Qing (various characters and tones), spelled Ch'ing in Wade–Giles:
 
 Qíng
 
 Chéng, spelled Ching based on its Cantonese pronunciation
 Zhuāng, spelled Ching based on its pronunciation in various Southern Min dialects

Ching is also a Cornish surname, from the Cornish dialect form of the surname Chinn, which originated as a nickname for people with distinctive chins.

Statistics
In Ontario, Canada, Ching was among the 200-most-common peculiarly Chinese surnames in a 2010 survey of the Registered Persons Database of Canadian health card recipients in the province.

According to statistics compiled by Patrick Hanks on the basis of the 2011 United Kingdom census and the Census of Ireland 2011, 493 people on the island of Great Britain and two on the island of Ireland bore the surname Ching as of 2011. In the 1881 United Kingdom census there had been 476 people with the surname Dann, primarily at Cornwall and neighbouring Devon.

The 2010 United States Census found 7,417 people with the surname Ching, making it the 4,772nd-most-common name in the country. against 6,919 people (4,683rd-most-common) in the 2000 Census. In both censuses, about seven-tenths of the bearers of the surname identified as non-Hispanic Asian or Pacific Islander, about nine percent as non-Hispanic white, and between four and six percent as Hispanic of any ethnicity. It was the 211th-most-common surname among Asian and Pacific Islanders.

People

Entertainment
 Carla Ching, American playwright, television writer, and teacher
 Joyce Ching (born 1995), Filipino actress and model
 Ching Li (born 1945), Hong Kong actress
 Ching Siu-tung (born 1953), Hong Kong action choreographer, actor, film director and producer
 William Ching (1913–1989), American actor

Surname of stage name:
 Ching Lau Lauro, stage name of a juggler and magician, possibly an Italian bandsman named Lauro Cecconi (1807–1892)
 Ching Ling Foo, stage name of the Chinese magician Chee Ling Qua (1854–1922)

Sport
 Brian Ching (born 1978), American soccer executive and retired player
 Danny Ching, American standup paddleboarder
 Ching Hong Aik (born 1973), Malaysian former footballer
 Ian Ching (1928–2006), New Zealand cricketer
 Laura Lee Ching (born 1951), American surfer
 Ching Siu Nga (born 1987), Hong Kong racewalking athlete

Government and politics
 Charles Ching (1935–2000), Hong Kong barrister and judge
 Ching Cheung-ying (born 1958), Hong Kong politician and schoolteacher
 Cyrus S. Ching (1876–1967), Canadian-American industrialist, federal civil servant and labor union mediator
 UK Ching (1937–2014), Bangladeshi freedom fighter

Other
 Frank Ching (born 1943), American architecture and design graphics writer and academic
 Jeffrey Ching (born 1965), Filipino classical composer
 Julia Ching (1934–2001), Chinese-born professor of religion, philosophy and East Asian studies in Canada
 Mariano Ching, Filipino artist
 Michael Ching (born 1958), American composer
 Pao-yu Ching (born 1937), Chinese-born American Marxist–Leninist–Maoist economist
 Patrick Ching (born ), American conservationist, wildlife artist, ornithological illustrator and author of children's books
 Raymond Ching (born 1939), New Zealand painter
 Ren-Chang Ching (1898–1986), Chinese botanist
 Te May Ching (nee Tsou; 1923–2020), Chinese-born agronomist in the United States
 Wai-Yim Ching (born 1945), Chinese-born physicist in the United States

See also
 Ching (given name)
 Ching Hai (born 1950), Vietnamese religious leader (Ching Hai is a dharma name meaning "clear sea")
 Ma Mya Ching, Bangladeshi politician

References 

Chinese-language surnames
Multiple Chinese surnames